Vladislav Ignatievich Strzhelchik (1921–1995) was a Soviet and Russian actor. People's Artist of the USSR (1974).

Biography 
Vladislav Strzhelchik born in Petrograd (now Saint Petersburg, Russia). His father, Ignatiy Petrovich was a native of Poland who settled in St. Petersburg at the beginning of the 20th century.

In 1938 Vladislav Strzhelchik was accepted into the studio of the Gorky Bolshoi Drama Theater and in the same year he became an actor of this theater, where he worked all his life. He graduated from the studio only in 1947. During the Great Patriotic War, Vladislav Strzhelchik was drafted into the Red Army and served in the infantry at the forefront.

In 1959–1968 Strzhelchik lectured at the Leningrad Institute for Theatre, Music and Cinematography,   since 1966 at the Leningrad Institute for Culture.

He died in Saint Petersburg on September 11, 1995 and buried actor on the famous Literatorskie mostki ("Writer's footworks") of Volkovo Cemetery.

Selected filmography 
 Ivan Pavlov (1949) as high-school student (uncredited)
 Resurrection (Воскресение, 1960–61) as Earl Shembok
 War and Peace (Война и мир, 1960–61) as Napoleon
 Major Whirlwind (Майор Вихрь, 1967) as Abwehr сolonel Berg
 Sofiya Perovskaya (Софья Перовская, 1967) as Alexander II of Russia / inquisitor
 Tchaikovsky (Чайковский, 1969) as Nikolai Rubinstein
 The Adjutant of His Excellency (Адъютант его превосходительства, 1969) as general Kovalevsky
 Liberation (Освобождение, 1970–71) as general Aleksei Antonov
 The Crown of the Russian Empire, or Once Again the Elusive Avengers (Корона Российской Империи, или Снова Неуловимые, 1971) as Naryshkin, a professional burglar
 Privalov's Millions (Приваловские миллионы, 1973) as Alexander Polovodov
 The Straw Hat (Соломенная шляпка, 1974) as Antoine Petitpierre Nonancourt
 The Captivating Star of Happiness (Звезда пленительного счастья, 1975) as Count Ivan Laval
 Father Sergius (Отец Сергий, 1978) as Nicholas I
 Khanuma (Ханума, 1978) as Prince Vano Pantiashvili
 Treasure Island (Остров сокровищ, 1982) as Squire Trelawney
 Time for Rest from Saturday to Monday (Время отдыха с субботы до понедельника, 1984) as Aleksey
 Gardes-Marines, Ahead! (Гардемарины, вперёд!, 1988) as Jean Armand de Lestocq

Honors
 Honored Artist of the RSFSR (1954)
People's Artist of the RSFSR (1965) 
People's Artist of the USSR (October 4, 1974)
Hero of Socialist Labour (1988)

References

External links
 
  Vladislav Strzhelchik  Biography 
  Vladislav Strzhelchik Filmography 

1921 births
1995 deaths
Male actors from Saint Petersburg
Russian male stage actors
People's Artists of the USSR
Honored Artists of the RSFSR
Heroes of Socialist Labour
Russian male film actors
Soviet male stage actors
Soviet male film actors
Recipients of the Order of Lenin
Recipients of the Vasilyev Brothers State Prize of the RSFSR